Storrie is a census-designated place (CDP) in Plumas County, California and about 20 miles northeast of Lake Oroville. As of the 2010 Census, the CDP had a population of four.

Geography
None of the area is covered with water.

Demographics

2010
At the 2010 census Storrie had a population of 4. The racial makeup of Storrie was 4 (100.0%) White, 0 (0.0%) African American, 0 (0.0%) Native American, 0 (0.0%) Asian, 0 (0.0%) Pacific Islander, 0 (0.0%) from other races, and 0 (0.0%) from two or more races. Hispanic or Latino of any race were 0 people (0.0%).

The whole population lived in households, no one lived in non-institutionalized group quarters and no one was institutionalized.

There were 2 households, 1 (50%) had children under the age of 18 living in them, 2 (100%) were opposite-sex married couples living together, 0 (0%) had a female householder with no husband present, 0 (0%) had a male householder with no wife present.  There were 0 (0%) unmarried opposite-sex partnerships, and 0 (0%) same-sex married couples or partnerships. 0 households (0%) were one person and 0 (0%) had someone living alone who was 65 or older. The average household size was 2.00.  There were 2 families (100% of households); the average family size was 2.00.

The age distribution was 0 people (0%) under the age of 18, 0 people (0%) aged 18 to 24, 0 people (0%) aged 25 to 44, 2 people (50.0%) aged 45 to 64, and 2 people (50.0%) who were 65 or older.  The median age was 62.5 years. For every 100 females, there were 100.0 males.  For every 100 females aged 18 and over, there were 100.0 males.

There were 9 housing units at an average density of 107.3 per square mile, of the occupied units 1 (50.0%) was owner-occupied and 1 (50.0%) was rented. The homeowner vacancy rate was 0%; the rental vacancy rate was 0%.  2 people (50.0% of the population) lived in owner-occupied housing units and 2 people (50.0%) lived in rental housing units.

2000
At the 2000 census, there were 5 people, 3 households, and 2 families in the CDP. The racial makeup of the CDP was 100.00% White.
Of the 3 households, none had children under the age of 18 living with them, 66.7% were married couples living together, none had a female householder with no husband present, and 33.3% were non-families. Individuals make up 33.3% of households, and none had someone living alone who is 65 or older. The average household size was 1.67 and the average family size was 2.00.

In the CDP, the entire population was spread out from 45 to 64, with a median age of 55 years. For every 2 females there were 3 males.

Politics

References

Census-designated places in Plumas County, California
Census-designated places in California